Cai Lậy is the name of the following geographical locations in Tiền Giang Province, Vietnam:

Cai Lậy (town), a district-level town
Cai Lậy District, a rural district
Former Cai Lậy township, dissolved in 2014 to form the new wards of Cai Lậy town